The Fearless-class patrol vessels were built by Singapore Technologies (ST) Marine for the Republic of Singapore Navy in the 1990s. Together, the ships formed the 182 and 189 Squadron.

On 30 January 2013, MINDEF awarded ST Engineering a contract for the design and build of eight new vessels to replace the Fearless-class patrol vessels. ST Engineering announced that the group's marine arm, ST Marine will build the eight vessels at its Singapore Benoi Yard. While the group's electronics arm, ST Electronics, will supply the core combat systems and combat system integration solutions. ST Marine will carry out the platform system integration as the lead system integrator. The first vessel was expected to be delivered in 2016 and all eight vessels would be fully operational by 2020.

History
The Fearless-class patrol vessels were ordered as replacements for the earlier Swift-class coastal patrol craft after they had been transferred to the Police Coast Guard. The contract was awarded to ST Marine on 27 February 1993. The first six vessels are fitted for anti-submarine warfare, while the remainder are configured as patrol vessels.

In 1996, the Defence Science Technology Agency project team leading the patrol vessel project was awarded the Defence Technology Prize.

On 3 January 2003,  was badly damaged in a collision with a container ship in the Singapore Strait. The ship has since been stricken from the navy list.

In January 2005, 189 Squadron was transferred to the Coastal Command from the Fleet, and the 11 ships now form the 182 and 189 Squadron.

In April 2012, ST Marine was awarded a contract by the Ministry of Defence of the Oman to build four  patrol vessels based on the Fearless class.

On 26 January 2021, at a ceremony at RSS Singapura, two vessels MSRV Sentinel and MSRV Guardian entered operational service as part of the four-ship Sentinel-class maritime security and response vessels (MSRV). The four ships are refurbished ex-Fearless-class patrol vessels to be deployed by the RSN's Maritime Security Command (MARSEC) in its Maritime Security and Response Flotilla. The other two, MSRV Protector and MSRV Bastion, will be refurbished and operationalised in the coming months, added Mindef. In addition to refitting the vessels to extend their operational lifespan, the Sentinel-class MSRVs will be installed with a range of calibrated capabilities. This includes enhanced communications equipment, improved visual and audio warning systems, installation of a fender system and modular ballistics protection.
 
In November 2021, ST Engineering was awarded a sub-contract for design, platform equipment and technical assistance by Abu Dhabi Ship Building (ADSB), which is building four Falaj 3-class Offshore Patrol Vessels based on the Fearless class for the UAE Navy.

Ships of class

Notes

References
 Navy unveils new maritime security flotilla, with armed ships that can go alongside vessels quickly

External links
MINDEF - Republic of Singapore Navy - Naval Assets

Patrol vessels
Patrol vessels of the Republic of Singapore Navy